Paulius Žalys (born 24 September 1995) is a Lithuanian professional basketball player for Kharkivski Sokoly of the Ukrainian Basketball Superleague.

Professional career
Professional career started in Žalgiris Kaunas.

In September 2019, Žalys signed with Kharkivski Sokoly of the Ukrainian Basketball Superleague.

In January 2020, Žalys signed with Avis Utilitas Rapla of the Latvian–Estonian Basketball League.

References

1995 births
Living people
BC Kharkivski Sokoly players
Lafayette Leopards men's basketball players
Lithuanian men's basketball players